The Cathedral of Christ the King is the mother church of the Roman Catholic Diocese of Superior in Superior, Wisconsin. It was named in honor of Christ the King.  The building is located at 1111 Belknap Street in Superior.

History

When the Diocese of Superior was established in 1905  Sacred Heart church, which had been established in the 1880s, was designated the pro-cathedral. Sacred Heart continued in this function until 1926.

1926—1927 construction
The cathedral construction project was announced in February 1926 and the groundbreaking occurred on June 23, 1926. Bishop Joseph Pinten blessed and laid the cornerstone for the Cathedral of Christ the King on October 24, 1926. The next day he left to assume his new appointment at Grand Rapids, Michigan. Construction continued on into 1927. The cathedral dedication ceremony was held on Christmas, 1927.

The congregation for the cathedral parish formed by the joining of existing Sacred Heart and St. Joseph parishes.

1937 fund drive
During the Depression funds were scarce to complete the undecorated interior of the cathedral. A fund drive was announced in 1937 by cathedral pastor Fr. Joseph Annabring to undertake this work. Despite modest funds, interior walls and ceiling were decorated and new pews, confessionals, and stained glass windows were added.

1946—1960 parish expansion
With continued growth, the cathedral congregation added a parish hall in 1946 and a rectory in 1948. The parish constructed a new school across the street from the cathedral in 1952 and a new convent in 1960.

2003—2004 renovation
The cathedral underwent a major renovation in 2003, with the church building closed for over a year while repairs to the exterior and renovations to the interior took place. Frescoes and an improved heating and air-conditioning system were added. The church re-opened in late 2004. The dedication ceremony for the renovated cathedral was in February 2005.

See also

List of Catholic cathedrals in the United States
List of cathedrals in the United States

References

External links

Official Cathedral Site
Diocese of Superior Official Site

Christ the King Superior
Christian organizations established in 1926
Churches completed in 1927
Roman Catholic churches completed in 1927
Italianate architecture in Wisconsin
Churches in Douglas County, Wisconsin
Churches in the Roman Catholic Diocese of Superior
Superior, Wisconsin
1927 establishments in Wisconsin
20th-century Roman Catholic church buildings in the United States
Italianate church buildings in the United States